The 2014–15 season was Hamilton Academical's first season in the top flight of Scottish football since 2010–11 season, and their first in the newly established Scottish Premiership having been promoted from the 2013–14 Scottish Championship through the Play-offs. Hamilton also competed in the League Cup and the Scottish Cup.

Summary

Management
The club began the 2014–15 season under the management of Alex Neil. On 9 January 2015, Neil left to become the new manager of, at the time, English Championship side Norwich City. Martin Canning was appointed Caretaker Player-manager, and was later on 23 January 2015 officially appointed Player-manager. With top goalscorer Tony Andreu also leaving, the club suffered with the sudden departures and Canning had to wait 14 matches for his first victory as manager, coming on 24 April 2015 in the Lanarkshire derby at home to Motherwell.

Results and fixtures

Pre-season

Scottish Premiership

Scottish League Cup

Scottish Cup

Squad statistics
During the 2014–15 season, Hamilton Academical have used twenty six different players in competitive games. The table below shows the number of appearances and goals scored by each player.

Appearances
Includes all competitive matches. 

|-
|colspan="12"|Players who left the club during the 2014–15 season
|-

|}

Goal scorers

Disciplinary record
Includes all competitive matches. 

As of matches played 23 May 2015

Team statistics

League table

Results by round

Results by opponent
Hamilton score first

Source: 2014–15 Scottish Premier League Results Table

Transfers

Players in

Players out

Notes and references

Hamilton Academical F.C. seasons
Hamilton Academical